Simone Pontello (born 8 September 1971) is a Brazilian basketball player. She competed in the women's tournament at the 1992 Summer Olympics.

References

1971 births
Living people
Brazilian women's basketball players
Olympic basketball players of Brazil
Basketball players at the 1992 Summer Olympics
Basketball players from São Paulo